Qukuhu Township (Mandarin: 曲库乎乡) is a township in Tongren County, Huangnan Tibetan Autonomous Prefecture, Qinghai, China. In 2010, Qukuhu Township had a total population of 7,223: 3,630 males and 3,593 females: 1,847 aged under 14, 4,889 aged between 15 and 65 and 487 aged over 65.

References 

Township-level divisions of Qinghai
Huangnan Tibetan Autonomous Prefecture